Grynchae or Grynchai was a town of ancient Euboea. Probably it is identifiable with the place-names that Stephanus of Byzantium mentions under the variants Rhyncae or Rhynkai (᾿Ρύγκαι) and Trychae or Trychai (Τρύχαι).<ref>{{Cite Stephanus|s. vv.'''}}</ref> It belonged to the Delian League since it appears in the tribute lists of Athens between the years 451/0 BCE and 416/5 BCE, where it paid a phoros'' of 1000 drachmae. At the end of the 5th century BCE, it became a deme of Eretria.

Its site is located near modern Krieza.

References

Populated places in ancient Euboea
Former populated places in Greece
Members of the Delian League
Ancient Eretria